Cantuar is an abbreviation of the Latin term Cantuariensis, meaning of Canterbury. It may refer to:
 Canterbury, a cathedral city which is part of the City of Canterbury, a local government district in Kent, England
 Cantuar, Saskatchewan, a ghost town in Canada
 City of Canterbury, a local government district in Kent, England
 See of Canterbury, an Anglican archiepiscopal see, the Latin abbreviation of whose name is typically used in the archbishop's signature
 University of Canterbury, a New Zealand university which uses Cantuar or Cant as an abbreviation for its name in post-nominal letters
 University of Kent, an English university which uses Cantuar as an abbreviation for its name in post-nominal letters

See also 
 Ebor (disambiguation)